Kevin Davis (born July 29, 1966) is an American gymnast. He competed at the 1988 Summer Olympics where he finished 35th in the individual all around and 11th with the American team in the team final.

References

External links
 

1966 births
Living people
American male artistic gymnasts
Olympic gymnasts of the United States
Gymnasts at the 1988 Summer Olympics
Sportspeople from Charleston, South Carolina
Pan American Games medalists in gymnastics
Pan American Games gold medalists for the United States
Gymnasts at the 1987 Pan American Games
20th-century American people